The fourth Balkenende cabinet was the executive branch of the Government of the Netherlands from 22 February 2007 until 14 October 2010. The cabinet was formed by the Christian-democratic Christian Democratic Appeal (CDA) and Christian Union (CU) and the social-democratic Labour Party (PvdA) after the election of 2006. The cabinet was a centrist grand coalition and had a slim majority in the House of Representatives with Christian Democratic Leader Jan Peter Balkenende serving as prime minister. Labour Leader Wouter Bos served as Deputy Prime Minister and Minister of Finance while Social Christian Leader André Rouvoet served as Deputy Prime Minister and Minister without Portfolio for Health, Welfare and Sport.

The cabinet served during the unstable late 2000s; domestically it had to deal with the financial crisis of 2008 and major reforms to the education system, while internationally, it had to deal with the war on terror and the government support for the Task Force Uruzgan. The cabinet suffered several major internal conflicts including multiple cabinet resignations. The cabinet fell prematurely on 20 February 2010 after the Labour Party refused to support an extension of the Task Force Uruzgan mission with the Labour Party cabinet members resigning on 23 February 2010, and the cabinet continued in a demissionary capacity until it was replaced after the election of 2010.

Formation

Following the fall of the Second Balkenende cabinet on 30 June 2006 the Democrats 66 (D66) left the coalition and the Christian Democratic Appeal and the People's Party for Freedom and Democracy (VVD) formed a rump cabinet. The Third Balkenende cabinet was installed on 7 July 2006 and served as a caretaker government until the election of 2006 on 22 November 2006. After the election the Christian Democratic Appeal (CDA) of incumbent Prime Minister Jan Peter Balkenende was the winner of the election but lost 3 seats and had now a total of 41 seats. The Labour Party (PvdA) of Wouter Bos lost 9 seats and had now 33 seats. The Socialist Party (SP) of Jan Marijnissen was the biggest winner with 16 new seats and had now 25 seats. Two new parties won representation in the House of Representatives, the recently founded Party for Freedom (PVV) of Geert Wilders, a former Member of the House of Representatives for the People's Party for Freedom and Democracy won nine seats and the Party for the Animals (PvdD) of Marianne Thieme, a noted animal rights activist won two seats, the first time an animal advocacy party won representation in a national legislative body.

On 25 November 2006 Queen Beatrix appointed Member of the Council of State Rein Jan Hoekstra (CDA) as Informateur. Hoekstra explored the possibilities for the different three party coalitions, since no two parties could form a majority in the House of Representatives together. This resulted in a coalition agreement between the Christian Democratic Appeal (CDA), Labour Party (PvdA) and the Christian Union (CU), together these three parties had 79 seats out of 150 seats in the House of Representatives.

On 20 December 2006 Queen Beatrix appointed former Chairman of the Social-Economic Council Herman Wijffels (CDA) as Informateur to start the second information round and negotiate a coalition agreement between the Leader of the Christian Democratic Appeal Jan Peter Balkenende, the Leader of the Labour Party Wouter Bos and the Leader of the Christian Union André Rouvoet. On 7 February 2007 a coalition was reached with the motto of the agreement: "Samen leven, samen werken" ("Living together, working together"). On 9 February 2007 Queen Beatrix appointed incumbent Prime Minister Jan Peter Balkenende (CDA) as Formateur to start the last phase of the formation. On 22 February the cabinet members were sworn in by Queen Beatrix.

Term

Policy
The coalition agreement titled "Living together, working together" was presented on 7 February in a press conference by Balkenende, Bos, Rouvoet. It is structured into six commitments of the new cabinet. If a proposal was included in a party's electoral manifesto, this is mentioned as well.

 An active and constructive role in the world, which is characterized by these policies:
 Continued investments into the Joint Strike Fighter (as the CDA proposed).
 The new cabinet is not in favour of a new referendum on the European Constitution, which was voted down in 2005, but will consider new initiatives (both the CDA and CU opposed the referendum initially).
 An innovative, competitive and entrepreneurial economy, which is characterized by these policies:
 1 billion increased spending on education (as all parties proposed).
 Privatization of Schiphol airport is shelved (as the CU and the PvdA proposed).
 A durable environment, which is characterized by these policies:
 800 million euros additional spending on renewable energy (as both the PvdA and the CU proposed).
 Pollution will be taxed more heavily (as both the PvdA and the CU proposed).
 A tax on airline tickets totalling 350 million euros (as all parties proposed).
 No new investments in nuclear energy (as the CU and the PvdA proposed).
 Social cohesion, which is characterized by these policies:
 A reform of the system of basic state pensions: people who have private pensions of 15,000 euros and higher and who stop working before the age of 65 will pay an additional tax as of 2011. People who work beyond 65 receive tax breaks. This measure should guarantee an affordable basic state pension (AOW) despite trends in population ageing (a compromise between the PvdA, which wanted to tax all rich elderly and the CDA which wanted incentives to make people work longer).
 Public social housing will not be liberalised, rent rates may be raised only in line with inflation (as the PvdA proposed).
 The tax deduction on mortgage interest payments remains unchanged (as the CDA proposed).
 Investments in problem areas in the large cities to make them "beautiful neighbourhoods" (as the PvdA proposed).
 Re-implementation of the subsidized jobs-scheme for the unemployed (as the PvdA proposed).
 Childcare spending totalling 700 million euros (free child care was a PvdA election promise and opposed by CDA).
 Safety, stability and respect, which is characterized by these policies:
 Reduction of all crimes by 25%.
 A ban on burqas and other face covering clothing for security reasons (as the CDA proposed).
  Government and a servile public sector
 In response to opposition to extravagant wages earned by some top civil servants and top level managers of quangos, sometimes five times that of the prime minister, no one will be allowed an income greater than the prime minister's. To accomplish this, the prime minister's salary will be increased.
 Cutting the number of civil servants to save 750 million euros.
 Women seeking an abortion are to expect an additional waiting period between first consultation and actual procedure on top of the already mandatory five days waiting period (as the CU proposed).
 Minor reforms of the health care-system, including the abolishment of the no claim and the re-inclusion of dental care into the basic insurance.
 Increased taxation on cigarettes and liquor, smoke-free bars and restaurants by 2011.
 A general pardon for asylum seekers who entered the Netherlands before the new Asylum Law came into effect (as both the CU and the PvdA proposed).
 The coalition wants to have a budget surplus of 1% of the GDP by 2011 with a projected 2% annual economic growth (as all parties proposed).

Fall and aftermath
In February 2010, NATO had officially requested the Netherlands to extend its military involvement in Task Force Uruzgan, the ISAF operation in the Afghan province of Uruzgan, aimed at training Afghan security forces and transfer of responsibilities to the local authorities. Coalition party PvdA strongly opposed the extension of the mission. The collision between the government and the parliament, of which the majority disagreed with an extension of the mission, as well as between the coalition partners in the cabinet, threatened the existence of the cabinet and led to its fall in the night between 19 and 20 February 2010, after 16 hours of deliberations between the cabinet members. The Labour members resigned from the cabinet.

As queen Beatrix was on holiday in Austria (Lech am Arlberg) at the time, Balkenende informed her formally by phone about the break-up of the cabinet. She returned soon to The Hague and held consultations with advisors and with the leaders of all political groupings in parliament on 22 and 23 February. On the latter day, the queen accepted the resignations of the PvdA ministers and secretaries, and maintained the 15 remaining cabinet members of CDA and Christian Union (whose positions had also been offered to the queen for consideration, a customary procedure in the Netherlands) to run a demissionary cabinet (caretaker government), which meant that it could not make large decisions or proposals on topics deemed controversial. No new cabinet members were appointed, the already functioning ministers and state secretaries taking care of the empty positions until a new government would be formed. Early elections were held on 9 June 2010. The cabinet formation started a day later.

Labour leader Wouter Bos, who resigned as deputy prime minister and finance minister, announced that he wanted to continue to lead his party. Labour Party leader Bos denied that the upcoming local elections in the Netherlands played a role in the decision to refuse to compromise on a possible extension of the Dutch military mission in Afghanistan.

Cabinet members

Trivia
 Six cabinet members had previous experience as scholars and professors: Jan Peter Balkenende (Christian Theology), Guusje ter Horst (Dental Medicine), Ernst Hirsch Ballin (Constitutional and Administrative Law), Ronald Plasterk (Molecular Genetics), Jacqueline Cramer (Environmental Studies) and Jet Bussemaker (Political Science).
 Seven cabinet members (later) served as Mayor: Guusje ter Horst (Nijmegen), Eberhard van der Laan (Amsterdam), Ank Bijleveld (Hof van Twente), Cees van der Knaap (Ede), Ahmed Aboutaleb (Rotterdam), Jetta Klijnsma (The Hague) and Marja van Bijsterveldt (Schipluiden and Delft).
 Ten cabinet members would later have other high-profile work, in the public sector: Wouter Bos (Dutch Investment Agency), André Rouvoet (Healthcare Insurance association) and Maxime Verhagen (Construction association), in the private sector: Jan Kees de Jager (KPN) and Ab Klink (VGZ Cooperative), and international functions: Maria van der Hoeven (International Energy Agency), Gerda Verburg (Food and Agriculture Organization), Bert Koenders (United Nations), Frans Timmermans (European Commission) and Frank Heemskerk (World Bank Group).

References

External links
Official

  Kabinet-Balkenende IV Parlement & Politiek
  Kabinet-Balkenende IV Rijksoverheid

Cabinets of the Netherlands
2007 establishments in the Netherlands
2010 disestablishments in the Netherlands
Cabinets disestablished in 2010
Cabinets established in 2007
Grand coalition governments